La Invasora (English title:My secret guest) is a Venezuelan telenovela developed by Iris Dubs and produced by Radio Caracas Television in 2003.

Daniela Alvarado and Juan Carlos García starred as protagonists with Rosalinda Serfaty, Jean Carlo Simancas, Mirela Mendoza and Carlos Arreaza as antagonists.

Plot
Mariana is a young woman whose life changes drastically when her mother discovers that her step-father Alberto Maldonado put her photos on an internet website called sinvidaprivada.com. Mariana runs away and decides to hide in the house of Sergio, the man of her life where she will invade his life without him knowing about it.

Cast

Main 
Daniela Alvarado as  Mariana del Carmen Guerra
Juan Carlos García as Sergio Martínez Aldana
Mimí Lazo as Inés Guerra
Jean Carlo Simancas as  Ignacio Martínez Aguiar
Rosalinda Serfaty as  Alicia Fuentes Manso
Fedra López as María Teresa Aldana
Javier Vidal as Alejandro Reyes

Recurring 

Mirela Mendoza as Ana Victoria Fuentes
Eliana López as Sofía Reyes Galié
Carlos Arreaza as Reynaldo FuentesEstefanía López as Maryuri Briceño
Eduardo Orozco as Enrique CárdenasHugo Vásquez as José Miguel Briceño
Manuel Salazar as Alberto Maldonado "El Beto"
Carmen Julia Álvarez as Rosario Díaz
Leopoldo Regnault as Jesús Briceño
Freddy Galavis as Don Pedro
Betty Ruth as Francisca
Simón Gómez as Juan Carlos
Josemith Bermúdez as Merly
Líber Chiribao as Iván Robles
Paula Bevilacqua as Vanessa Martínez Aldana
Milagros Boullosa as Verónica
Génesis Blanco as María Virginia Martínez Aldana
Ángelo Goncalves as Diego Maldonado Guerra
David Gutiérrez  as Alán Reyes Galié
Alexander Montilla as González
José Romero as El Jhonny
José Félix Cárdenas as Prof. Villegas
Ana Gabriela Barboza as Raquel
Zoe Bolívar as Magdalena
Alejandro Palacios as Karl
Nacho Huett as Guillermo
Cristal Avilera as Kathy
Alfonso Medina as Sebastián
Ana Beatriz Osorio as Yadira
Vicente Tepedino as Maximiliano Quiroz
Linsabel Noguera as Xiomara
Julio Pereira as Héctor Lander
Sheyla Gutiérrez as La Mariposa
Alessandra Guilarte as Abogada
María Alejandra Requena as Pesentadora de Talk Show

References

External links

2003 telenovelas
2003 Venezuelan television series debuts
2004 Venezuelan television series endings
RCTV telenovelas
Venezuelan telenovelas
Spanish-language telenovelas
Television shows set in Caracas